Ládví is a Prague Metro station on Line C, located in Kobylisy, Prague 8. The station was opened on 26 June 2004 as the northern terminus of the Line C extension from Nádraží Holešovice. It remained the temporary northern terminus of Line C until the line was extended to Letňany on 8 May 2008.

The station is 8.8 metres below ground level, and contains two tracks on opposite sides of the station platform. The station has one exit in the middle leading to tram stops and a bus station.

References

External links 

 Gallery and information 

Prague Metro stations
Railway stations opened in 2004
2004 establishments in the Czech Republic
Railway stations in the Czech Republic opened in the 21st century